James Trevor Oliver MBE OSI (born 27 May 1975) is an English chef, restaurateur and cookbook author. He is known for his casual approach to cuisine, which has led him to front numerous television shows and open many restaurants.

Oliver reached the public eye when his series The Naked Chef premiered in 1999. In 2005, he opened a campaign, Feed Me Better, to introduce schoolchildren to healthier foods, which was later backed by the government. He was the owner of a restaurant chain, Jamie Oliver Restaurant Group, which opened its first restaurant, Jamie's Italian, in Oxford in 2008. The chain went into administration in May 2019.

His TED Talk won him the 2010 TED Prize. In June 2003, Oliver was made a Member of the Order of the British Empire for "services to the hospitality industry".

Early life
Oliver was born and raised in the village of Clavering in Essex. His parents, Trevor and Sally Oliver, ran a pub/restaurant, The Cricketers, where he practised cooking in the kitchen with his parents. He has one sibling, sister Anne-Marie and was educated at Newport Free Grammar School.

He left school at the age of 16 with two GCSE qualifications in Art and Geology and went on to attend Westminster Technical College now Westminster Kingsway College. He then earned a City & Guilds National Vocational Qualification (NVQ) in home economics.

Career

Oliver's first job was a pastry chef at Antonio Carluccio's Neal Street restaurant, where he first gained experience at preparing Italian cuisine, and developed a relationship with his mentor Gennaro Contaldo; later in his career Oliver employed Contaldo to help run his collection of high street restaurants, Jamie's Italian. Oliver moved to The River Café, Fulham, as a sous-chef. He was noticed there by the BBC in 1997, after making an unscripted appearance in a documentary about the restaurant, Christmas at the River Cafe.

In 1999, his BBC show The Naked Chef debuted, and his cookbook became a bestseller in the United Kingdom. That same year, Oliver was invited to prepare lunch for the then-Prime Minister Tony Blair at 10 Downing Street.

After three series of Naked Chef programmes (The Naked Chef, Return of the Naked Chef & Happy Days with The Naked Chef) for the BBC, Oliver moved to Channel 4 in the United Kingdom, where his first series was a documentary, Jamie's Kitchen, which followed the setting up of Fifteen restaurant in London. The restaurant, in Westland Place, London continued to train young adults who have a disadvantaged background for careers in the restaurant business until its closure on 21 May 2019.

In June 2003, Oliver was awarded an MBE for his services to the hospitality industry. Although it is customary to wear morning dress or a lounge suit  for the event, Oliver did not wear a tie with his brown Paul Smith suit, saying: "I like ties but I prefer not to wear one when I am nervous."

In 2005, Oliver initiated a campaign originally called "Feed Me Better" to move British schoolchildren towards eating healthy foods and cutting out junk food. As a result, the British government also pledged to address the issue. His public campaign for changes in nutrition resulted in people voting him as the "Most Inspiring Political Figure of 2005", according to a Channel 4 News annual viewer poll. His emphasis on cooking fresh, nutritious food continued as he created Jamie's Ministry of Food, a television series where Oliver travelled to inspire everyday people in Rotherham, Yorkshire, to cook healthy meals. Another television series is Jamie Oliver's Food Revolution (2010–11), where he travelled first to Huntington, West Virginia and then to Los Angeles to change the way Americans eat, and address their dependence on fast food.

Oliver's holding company, Jamie Oliver Holdings Ltd., earned enough for Oliver to have been listed on The Sunday Times list of richest Britons under 30.

In December 2009, Oliver received the 2010 TED Prize.

He hosted Jamie's 15 Minute Meals on Channel 4, which aired for 40 episodes in 2012.

Oliver is the second-best-selling British author, behind J. K. Rowling, and the best-selling British non-fiction author since records began. , Oliver has sold more than 14.55 million books, generating just under £180m for the chef.

Jamie Oliver Restaurant Group

In June 2008, Oliver launched a restaurant, Jamie's Italian, his first high street business venture, in Oxford, England. At its peak, there were 42 Jamie's Italian restaurants in the UK. The brand was franchised and includes branches in Australia (which Oliver part-bought back in November 2016 after its founders went bankrupt), Canada, Cyprus, Hong Kong, Iceland, Ireland, Qatar, Russia, Taiwan, Turkey, the UAE and Singapore.

In January 2017, Chief Executive Simon Blagden announced the closure of six restaurants in the UK affecting 120 jobs, at sites in Aberdeen, Cheltenham, Exeter, Royal Tunbridge Wells, and in London at Ludgate and Richmond.

In January 2018, as part of an agreement with creditors to secure £71.5M of debt, JORG proposed to enter the UK company Jamie's Italian Ltd into a company voluntary arrangement, seeking rent reductions on eight outlets and closing a further 12 in Bath, Bristol, Bluewater, Chelmsford, Harrogate, Kingston, Milton Keynes, Reading, and St Albans, and Greenwich, Piccadilly and Threadneedle Street in London. As part of the agreement, court papers revealed that Jamie's Italian had debts of £71.5m, including £2.2m in wages owed to staff; £30.2m of overdrafts and loans; £41.3m owed to landlords, HM Revenue and Customs, suppliers and other creditors; with £47m of the debts covered by loans from HSBC Bank and Oliver's other companies.

In 2009, Oliver's chain of cooking school/delis, Recipease, opened in several locations in the UK including Brighton, Battersea, and Notting Hill in London. By the end of 2015, all stores had been closed.

In 2011, Oliver set up Barbecoa, a barbecued meat-based restaurant with his friend, American barbecue expert Adam Perry Lang. There were two outlets, both in London, one in Piccadilly and a second in St Pauls. In 2014 the Piccadilly outlet voluntarily closed for 24 hours after hygiene inspectors gave it the second-lowest rating. The Times reported they had found mouse droppings, mouldy carcasses and out-of-date meat. In February 2018, JORG confirmed that they had "instructed a firm of real estate agents to ascertain the potential value and market suitability of two of our sites". On 19 February 2018, Barbecoa Ltd went into administration, with Oliver immediately buying back the St Paul's site in a pre-packed agreement via a new subsidiary.

The group went into administration on 21 May 2019 with 22 of 25 restaurants closed and 1,000 jobs lost. Jamie's Italian restaurants and Jamie Oliver's Diner at Gatwick Airport continued operations until they were sold to catering company SSP. Jamie Oliver's Fifteen Cornwall at Watergate Bay, as well as 61 overseas locations and the catering services operated by Aramark in the U.S., are all operated by franchisees so they were unaffected.

In January 2020, KPMG, the firm administrators, said that most of the £80 million Jamie Oliver's restaurant chain owed after its collapse in May 2019 will not be recovered. Hundreds of suppliers, as well as some town councils, will bear the brunt of the losses. In 2020 an employment tribunal ruled that Oliver's restaurants broke labour laws by failing to consult employees prior to making them redundant.

Oliver also partnered with Toronto restaurateur King Street Co. and executive chef Rob Gentile to open Jamie's Italians including a location in Yorkdale Shopping Centre.

Advertising

From June 2000, Oliver became the public face of the Sainsbury's supermarket chain in the UK, appearing on television and radio advertisements and in-store promotional material. The deal earned him an estimated £1.2 million every year, although neither J. Sainsbury nor Oliver has ever discussed the exact figure. By 2004, the company had made 65 advertisements with him, but the arrangement was not without controversy. Oliver was reported to have admitted that he does not use supermarkets, despite regularly having "product placement" in his early TV series.

He criticised Sainsbury's CEO Justin King when Oliver slammed the "junk" sold by supermarkets that ends up in the lunchboxes of millions of children. King reportedly hit back, saying: "Dictating to people—or unleashing an expletive-filled tirade—is not the way to get engagement." In July 2011, after eleven years, the partnership between Oliver and Sainsbury's ended. The final television advertisement was for Christmas 2011.

Oliver also markets a line of non-stick pans and cookware for Tefal and has appeared in Australian television commercials for Yalumba wines, using Del Boy's catchphrase of "Lovely Jubbly".

In August 2013, Oliver and Canadian supermarket chain Sobeys announced a partnership in improving nationwide nutrition and advertising campaigns. In October 2013, he began a partnership with the Australian chain Woolworths Supermarkets on a series of better nutrition initiatives and advertising campaigns.

In January 2016, Oliver and HelloFresh, an international meal kit subscription service, announced a partnership to incorporate his recipes to the weekly subscription deliveries. Customers receive one recipe written by Jamie Oliver with all the exact ingredients and steps for the dish. HelloFresh also agreed to the Jamie Oliver Food Foundation per Meal Box in addition to supporting other Foundation activities.

In September 2018, Oliver created a series of recipes and tips for Tesco and participated in the promotion of the company's food products.

Controversies
In 2005, Oliver was widely criticised by animal rights groups for slaughtering a lamb on his TV show without first stunning it, with PETA stating that it showed to the public problems with the methods used within slaughterhouses. PETA spokesman Sean Gifford said that it was hoped the footage "could turn the more die-hard carnivore into a vegetarian". British TV regulator Ofcom reported seven complaints from the public.

Oliver has commented on other chefs and has spoken out against Marco Pierre White, who has been critical of Oliver in the past, and the swearing of Gordon Ramsay.

In 2005, Oliver embarked upon his school dinners campaign to improve the quality of food fed to pupils in schools.  The campaign was arguably successful.

That same year, he came under fire for lack of food safety protections in his restaurants and illnesses associated with under-cooking mincemeat that may have been contaminated with E. coli.

Oliver and Gordon Ramsay are spokespeople for the "Big Fish Fight", which campaigns for sustainable seafood, but were criticised for their use of endangered fish.

Oliver was criticised for underestimating the cost of supposedly cheap food he encouraged poor people to prepare for themselves, as well as for an unrealistic view of poverty in Britain and round the Mediterranean. Cookery writer and poverty campaigner Jack Monroe stated that Oliver's comments "support damaging myths that poor people are only poor because they spend their money on the wrong things, rather than being constrained by time, equipment, knowledge or practicalities".

In 2014, Oliver became the culinary face of Woolworths Supermarkets. Oliver came under strong criticism over the funding of the advertising surrounding his relationship with the supermarket."Moreover, in this case he is not a spectator but effectively a beneficiary of these demands on our farmers. If he doesn't approve of Woolworths' ethics, he can withdraw from the campaign, and refund his endorsement fee. In the last 12 months, the average vegetable grower has gone from making a small profit to making a loss. In the same 12 months, Mr Oliver's wealth rose by an estimated £90 million. Now we know how."

In February 2017, Oliver criticised the Red Tractor scheme, earning the ire of farming leaders, such as Minette Batters, the president of the NFU. Oliver said: "Chickens are bred to grow fast with a high ratio of meat to bone, but this makes them heavy so they can struggle to walk...I think people would be shocked by the reality of what we are buying...I personally wouldn't feed it to my kids." Batters pointed out that: "There are a lot of people on tight budgets and they must not be disadvantaged in all of this. It is about making sure we can provide quality affordable, safe, traceable food to everybody regardless of budgets, regardless of background."

In 2019, Oliver partnered with Royal Dutch Shell to offer a Jamie Oliver Deli by Shell branded range at 500 Shell petrol stations in the UK for £5 million. The deal was criticised as a way to improve their image due to Shell's lack of action on climate change, corruption and bribery allegations and damaged Oliver's image of working in the interests of children and for action on climate change.

Charity and campaigning
Oliver conceived and established the Fifteen charity restaurant, where he trained disadvantaged young people to work in the hospitality industry. Following the success of the original restaurant in London, more Fifteens have opened around the globe: Fifteen Amsterdam opened in December 2004, Fifteen Cornwall in Newquay in May 2006 and Fifteen Melbourne in September 2006 with an Australian friend and fellow chef Tobie Puttock. Fifteen Melbourne has since closed, as has Fifteen Cornwall.

Oliver began a formal campaign to ban unhealthy food in British schools and to get children eating nutritious food instead. Oliver's efforts to bring radical change to the school meals system, chronicled in the series Jamie's School Dinners, challenged the junk-food culture by showing schools they could serve healthy, cost-efficient meals that kids enjoyed eating. His efforts brought the subject of school dinners to the political forefront and changed the types of food served in schools.

Oliver's Ministry of Food campaign began in 2008 with the Channel 4 series of the same name and the opening of the first Ministry of Food Centre in Rotherham. More MoF Centres have since opened in Bradford, Leeds, Newcastle/North-East, Stratford (now known as Food Academy) and Alnwick. Ministry of Food Centres and trucks have opened in Australia in Ipswich, near Brisbane and Geelong, near Melbourne. State governments in Australia provided funding for these Centres.

In December 2009, Oliver was awarded the 2010 TED Prize for his campaigns to "create change on both the individual and governmental levels" to "bring attention to the changes that the English, and now Americans, need to make in their lifestyles and diet". In 2010, he joined several other celebrity chefs on the series The Big Fish Fight, in which Oliver and fellow chefs Hugh Fearnley-Whittingstall and Gordon Ramsay made a variety of programmes  to raise awareness about the discarding of hundreds of thousands of saltwater fish because the fishermen are prohibited from keeping any fish other than the stated target of the trawl. He is a patron of environmental charity Trees for Cities.

Oliver's net worth was estimated in 2014 at £240 million.

In 2017, Oliver was approached by senior managers asking if he was interested in becoming a supporter for a campaign to tackle food waste called "Fresh Thinking for Forgotten Food" an idea invented by the British Domestic Appliance manufacturer Hotpoint. As well as the company allowing Oliver to have a free of charge Electric Single Oven and Gas Hob with their latest technologies to advertise. In 2018, Hotpoint built a pop up cafe based around on their campaign in London with Oliver opening it.

In April 2022, Oliver co-organized together with Ukrainian chef Yurii Kovryzhenko a charity dinner in London within an initiative #CookForUkraine to raise money for Ukrainians who suffered from Russian invasion of Ukraine.

Awards and honours
On 13 May 2001, Oliver's series The Naked Chef won the BAFTA award for Best Feature at the prestigious 2001 British Academy Television Awards, held at the Grosvenor House Hotel in Park Lane, London.

In June 2003, Oliver was awarded the MBE in the Queen's Birthday Honours. A proponent of fresh organic foods, Oliver was named the most influential person in the UK hospitality industry when he topped the inaugural Caterersearch.com 100 in May 2005. The list placed Oliver higher than Sir Francis Mackay, the then-chairman of the contract catering giant Compass Group, which Oliver had soundly criticised in Jamie's School Dinners. In 2006, Oliver dropped to second on the list behind fellow celebrity chef Gordon Ramsay. In July 2010, Oliver regained the top spot and was named as the most powerful and influential person in the UK hospitality industry once again.

On 21 August 2010, Oliver won an Emmy for Jamie Oliver's Food Revolution at the 62nd Primetime Creative Arts Emmy Awards. The series tackled the problem of childhood obesity in America.

In 2013, Oliver was awarded an Honorary Fellowship by the Royal College of General Practitioners for his work in tackling childhood obesity by improving the nutritional value of school dinners.

On 29 October 2015, Oliver was listed by UK-based company Richtopia at number 2 in the list of 100 Most Influential British Entrepreneurs.

In 2019, Oliver was awarded the Order of the Star of Italy with the rank of Knight. The investiture took place at the Italian embassy in 2021.

Personal life
In July 2000, Oliver married former model and writer Juliette Norton, usually known as "Jools". They have five children: Poppy Honey Rosie (born 18 March 2002), Daisy Boo Pamela (born 10 April 2003), Petal Blossom Rainbow (born 3 April 2009), Buddy Bear Maurice (born 15 September 2010), and River Rocket Blue Dallas (born 7 August 2016).

Oliver has severe dyslexia, and read his first novel, Catching Fire, by American novelist Suzanne Collins (the second book in the three-book The Hunger Games series) in 2013, at the age of 38.

In 2015 Oliver told The Times magazine that he had lost  in three months by changing his diet and getting enough sleep.

During the summer of 2019, Jamie and his family moved into Spains Hall, the 16th-century mansion in Finchingfield, Essex. The £6m property is located on a  estate and includes a six-bedroom farmhouse, three-bedroom lodge, swimming pool, tennis court and converted stables.

Oliver was chosen by Disney Pixar to provide the British English voice of the health inspector in the 2007 animated movie Ratatouille.

Television shows

Other media appearances 
Oliver has twice guest-hosted Channel 4's The Friday Night Project and has made two appearances in the "Star in a Reasonably-Priced Car" segment of BBC Two's Top Gear. In his first appearance he attempted to make a green salad in the back of his Volkswagen Microbus, which was fitted with a Porsche engine, while the Stig drove it around the Top Gear test track. 

Oliver is the second British celebrity chef (after Robert Irvine) to appear as a challenger on Iron Chef America, taking on Iron Chef Mario Batali in 2008 in a losing battle with cobia as the theme ingredient.

Oliver was one of the judges in the Oprah's Big Give hosted by Oprah Winfrey in the United States in 2008.

The Happy Days Live tour was Oliver's first live show in 2001 and included several dates in the UK and Australasia. Performing to sold-out venues, he cooked on stage and interacted with the audiences with competitions, music and special effects only usually seen in pop concerts. He took the audiences by surprise by singing and drumming to a song called Lamb Curry written by his longtime friend Leigh Haggerwood.

Oliver took to the road once more in 2006 on an Australian tour where he performed in Sydney and Melbourne. Following the entertaining format of his first live show, the 2006 Australian tour featuring special guests including mentor Gennaro Contaldo, and students from Fifteen London. He performed a new song written by Leigh Haggerwood called Fish Stew which Oliver cooked to and also drummed along to at the end of the show. The shows were featured in a one-off TV documentary called Jamie Oliver: Australian Diary.

On 27 December 2022 Oliver was the Guest Editor on the Today Programme on BBC Radio 4.

Books
 The Naked Chef (Michael Joseph, 1999) 
 The Return of the Naked Chef (Michael Joseph, 2000) 
 Published in the United States as The Naked Chef Takes Off (Hachette, 2001) 
 Happy Days with the Naked Chef (Michael Joseph, 2001) 
 Jamie's Kitchen (Michael Joseph, 2002) 
 Funky Food for Comic Relief (Penguin, 2003) 
 Jamie's Dinners (Michael Joseph, 2004) 
 Jamie's Italy (Michael Joseph, 2005) 
 Something for the Weekend (Penguin, 2005) 
 Cook with Jamie: My Guide to Making You a Better Cook  (Michael Joseph, 2006) 
 Jamie's Little Book of Big Treats (Penguin, 2007) 
 Jamie at Home: Cook Your Way to the Good Life (Michael Joseph, 2007) 
 Jamie's Ministry of Food: Anyone Can Learn to Cook in 24 Hours (Michael Joseph, 2008) 
 Published in the United States as Jamie's Food Revolution: Rediscover How to Cook Simple, Delicious, Affordable Meals (Hachette, 2008) 
 Jamie's Red Nose Recipes (Penguin, 2009) 
 Jamie's America (Michael Joseph, 2009) 
 Jamie does...Spain, Italy, Sweden, Morocco, Greece, France (Michael Joseph, 2010) 
 Jamie's 30-Minute Meals (Michael Joseph, 2010) 
 Jamie's Great Britain (Michael Joseph, 2011) 
 Jamie's Monster Bake Sale (Penguin, 2011) 
 Jamie's 15-Minute Meals (Michael Joseph, 2012) 
 Save with Jamie (Michael Joseph, 2013) 
 Jamie's Comfort Food (Michael Joseph, 2014) 
 Everyday Super Food (Michael Joseph, 2015) 
 Super Food Family Classics (Michael Joseph, 2016) 
 Jamie Oliver's Christmas Cookbook (Michael Joseph, 2016) 
 5 Ingredients – Quick & Easy Food (Michael Joseph, 2017) 
 Jamie Cooks Italy (Michael Joseph, 2018) 
 Jamie's Friday Night Feast Cookbook (Michael Joseph, 2018) 
 Veg: Easy & Delicious Meals for Everyone (Michael Joseph, 2019) 
 7 Ways (Michael Joseph, 2020) 
 Together (Michael Joseph, 2021) 
 One: Simple One-Pan Wonders (Michael Joseph, 2022)

References

Further reading
 Stafford Hildred, Jamie Oliver: The Biography (2001) 
 Gilly Smith, Jamie Oliver: Turning Up the Heat (2006) 
 Gilly Smith, Jamie Oliver: The Kitchen Crusader (2006)

External links

 
 

1975 births
BAFTA winners (people)
British Book Award winners
British male bloggers
Chefs of Italian cuisine
British cookbook writers
British restaurateurs
Emmy Award winners
English bloggers
English food writers
English chefs
English health activists
English philanthropists
English restaurateurs
English television chefs
English television presenters
English YouTubers
Food activists
Food and cooking YouTubers
Food Network chefs
Living people
Male chefs
Members of the Order of the British Empire
People educated at Hockerill Anglo-European College
People educated at Newport Free Grammar School
People from Clavering, Essex
Writers with dyslexia
Shorty Award winners
Social entrepreneurs
Television personalities from Essex
English video bloggers
Writers from Essex
Lifestyle YouTubers
British gastronomes